Paul Michael Iogolevitch (December 12, 1901 – December 8, 1980), later known as Capton Michael Paul was a violinist who joined the Russian Army at age 15 and fought in World War I. He migrated to the United States where he became wealthy in the petroleum industry. He founded the C. Michael Paul Foundation.

Early life
He was born on December 12, 1901 in Outer Mongolia to Michael A. Iogolevitch, a physician who later became the surgeon general of Czar Nicholas II of Russia.

Military career
Iogolevitch served in World War I fighting for Russia where he won two Cross of St. George medals.

Personal life
In 1942 he married former Broadway Actress Martha Mackay.

In 1959 he married Josephine Perfect Bay in Palm Beach, Florida.

U.S. President John F. Kennedy would stay at his estate, in 1961 and 1962.

Philanthropy
In 1965 he donated $1M toward the C. Michael Paul Hall at the Juilliard School.

Death
He died on December 8, 1980 at Good Samaritan Hospital in West Palm Beach, Florida.

Legacy
C. Michael Paul Hall at the Juilliard School.

References

Emigrants from the Russian Empire to the United States
1901 births
1980 deaths
American financial businesspeople
Russian businesspeople in the United States